Amardeep Singh is a Singapore-based Punjabi researcher, writer, photographer and documentary filmmaker. Currently, he and his wife, Vininder Kaur, are the managing directors of Lost Heritage Productions, a media production house started by them. He formerly worked in the financial sector as an executive. He won the Guru Nanak Interfaith Prize in 2022 for retracing the journey of Guru Nanak, the first Sikh Guru, in his docu-series Allegory: A Tapestry of Guru Nanak's Travels.

Biography 
His family migrated from Muzaffarabad, Kashmir (now in Pakistani-administered Kashmir) to Gorakhpur, Uttar Pradesh in India (then British India) just before the Partition of India in 1947. His father, Sunder Singh, was a goldsmith.

After studying at the Doon School, he went on to study Electronics Engineering from Manipal Institute of Technology. He later did a master's degree in business administration from the University of Chicago, U.S.

He worked in the financial sector for 25 years, during which he worked for the American Express for 21 years. He moved from India to Hong Kong and eventually settled in Singapore in 2001. He became a Singaporean citizen in 2005. He resigned from his job in 2013.

In 2014, he started researching on the visual ethnography of Sikh history and legacy. He went to Pakistan to document the tangible and intangible remnants of Sikh legacy in the country. In 2016, he published his first book Lost Heritage: The Sikh Legacy In Pakistan. The book is based on his travels to 36 towns and villages of Pakistan. The book highlighted the magnificence of hundreds of Sikh gurdwaras, architecture, forts, arts, and culture.

He went on to publish his second book in 2017, The Quest Continues: Lost Heritage - The Sikh Legacy In Pakistan. For this book, he traveled to another 90 cities and villages.

In 2020, he published two documentary films; Peering Warrior and Peering Soul based on his experiences in Pakistan.

In 2019, he started working on Allegory: A Tapestry of Guru Nanak's Travels, which is a 24 episode docuseries filmed across 9 different countries and 150 multi-faith sites. The English, Gurmukhi (Punjabi) and Shahmukhi (Punjabi) versions are available on TheGuruNanak.com. Hindi and Urdu versions of the docuseries are expected to be published in the coming years with the help of crowdfunding.

Works 

 Lost Heritage: The Sikh Legacy In Pakistan - 2016
 The Quest Continues: Lost Heritage - The Sikh Legacy In Pakistan - 2018

Filmography 

 Peering Warrior - 2020
 Peering Soul - 2020
 Allegory: A Tapestry of Guru Nanak's Travels - 2021-22

Awards 

 The Guru Nanak Interfaith Prize - 2022

References

External links 

 Lost Heritage Productions Website
 Allegory: A Tapestry of Guru Nanak's Travels on TheGuruNanak.com 
 Documentary Peering Soul on Youtube
 Documentary Peering Warrior on Youtube

Writers from Punjab, India
Punjabi-language film directors
The Doon School alumni
Singaporean Sikhs